Ornativalva zangezurica is a moth of the family Gelechiidae. It was described by Piskunov in 1978. It is found in Armenia.

References

Moths described in 1978
Ornativalva